Isabel Marie Keenan Patelunas is an American government official. She is a member of the Senior Intelligence Service at the Central Intelligence Agency, where she has worked since 1989. Patelunas has served as Director of the President's Daily Brief staff, Deputy Director of the C.I.A.'s Office of Middle East and North Africa Analysis, and as Director of the Advanced Analysis Training Program. She has also held roles with the National Counterproliferation Center and the Weapons Intelligence, Nonproliferation, and Arms Control Center.

In June 2017, Patelunas was nominated by President Donald Trump to serve as Assistant Secretary for Intelligence and Analysis at the United States Department of the Treasury.

References

Living people
University of Notre Dame alumni
University System of Maryland alumni
People of the Central Intelligence Agency
Trump administration personnel
Year of birth missing (living people)